Thirteen Buddhist Sites of Osaka（おおさか十三仏霊場, Osaka jūsan butsu reijō）are a group of 13 Buddhist sacred sites in Osaka Prefecture dedicated to the Thirteen Buddhas. The majority of the temples in this grouping are part of Japanese esoteric Shingon Buddhism. The pilgrimage group was established in 1979.

Directory

See also
 Thirteen Buddhas

External links 
Osaka Thirteen Buddhist Sites Pilgrimage

Buddhist temples in Osaka Prefecture
Buddhist pilgrimage sites in Japan